Zazao is an Oceanic language spoken in the Solomon Islands. Its speakers live on Santa Isabel Island. It is considered nearly extinct, and its speakers also use the Cheke Holo language or the Zabana language.

References

Critically endangered languages
Endangered Austronesian languages
Endangered languages of Oceania
Languages of the Solomon Islands
Ysabel languages